Chaetostoma joropo is a species of catfish in the family Loricariidae. It is native to South America, where it occurs in the Cusiana River basin in the Orinoco drainage in Colombia. The species reaches at least 12.47 cm (4.9 inches) SL and was described in 2016 by Gustavo A. Ballen of the University of London, as well as Alexander Urbano-Bonilla and Javier A. Maldonado-Ocampo of the Pontifical Xavierian University. It appears in the aquarium trade, where it is frequently referred to by its L-number, which is L-445. This species has reportedly been known to aquarists for quite some time prior to its 2016 scientific description.

References 

Fish described in 2016
joropo